"We Came to Dance" is the final single from Ultravox's sixth studio album Quartet (the third studio album recorded with singer Midge Ure), recorded in Air Studios and released on Chrysalis Records on 18 April 1983. The single reached #18 on the UK charts on 18 June.  This was the last of seven consecutive top-20 singles for the band.

Track listing

7" version
 "We Came to Dance" – 4:05
 "Overlook" – 4:04
 Alternate versions of the 7" single have "Break Your Back" on the b-side instead of "Overlook".

12" version – UK release 
 "We Came to Dance (Extended Version)" – 7:35
 "Overlook" – 4:04

12" version – German release/UK Promo 

 "We Came to Dance" – 7:57
 "Reap the Wild Wind (Live Version)" – 3:53
 "Break Your Back" – 3:25

References

1982 songs
1983 singles
Ultravox songs
Songs written by Midge Ure
Songs written by Chris Cross
Songs written by Billy Currie
Songs written by Warren Cann
Song recordings produced by George Martin
Chrysalis Records singles
Songs about dancing